St. Mary's (also known as St. Mary's Ridge) is an unincorporated community in the town of Jefferson in Monroe County, Wisconsin, United States.

History
St. Mary's was first settled in 1856 by families who had immigrated to America from Stommeln, northwest of Cologne, North Rhine-Westphalia, Germany. Those families thrived and branched-out through emigration to other States - notably to: Nebraska, South Dakota, Iowa, Missouri, California, and other Wisconsin counties. In 2007, a 500-page book was published (privately) by the "St. Mary's Ridge Heritage Project," Cashton, Wisconsin, entitled: "St. Mary's Ridge Heritage - Histories of Our Pioneers." A second, revised edition is planned (circa 2009). Photos of St. Mary's were once selected for use within an official White House pamphlet, as "one of America's most beautiful places," by former First Lady, Lady Bird Johnson wife of former United States President Lyndon B. Johnson.

References
'St. Marys Ridge', St. Mary's Heritage Project, Cashton, Wisconsin, 2007.

External links
St. Mary's Ridge Wisconsin
St. Mary's Ridge Parish
St. Mary's Ridge Catholic Cemetery
Saint Mary's Ridge Genealogy (Monroe Co., WI. Pioneers)

Unincorporated communities in Monroe County, Wisconsin
Unincorporated communities in Wisconsin